The 1976–77 Midland Football League was the 77th in the history of the Midland Football League, a football competition in England.

Premier Division

The Premier Division featured 17 clubs which competed in the previous season, along with one new club:
Brigg Town, joined from the Lincolnshire Football League

League table

Division One

Division One featured 13 clubs which competed in the previous season, along with four new clubs:
Attenborough, joined from the Central Alliance
Carrvale United
Dinnington Colliery
Ilkeston Town reserves

League table

References

Midland Football League (1889)
8